Melody Maker was a British weekly pop music newspaper which was published from 1926 to 2000. Record charts in the United Kingdom began life on 14 November 1952 when NME (New Musical Express) began compiling the first UK-wide sales-based hit parade. Melody Makers own chart began on 7 April 1956. Prior to 15 February 1969, when the British Market Research Bureau chart was established, there was no one universally accepted source and many periodicals compiled their own chart. During this time the BBC used aggregated results of charts from the NME and other sources to compile the Pick of the Pops chart. In 1969, Record Retailer and the BBC commissioned the British Market Research Bureau (BMRB) to compile the singles chart.

Prior to this, The Official Charts Company and Guinness' British Hit Singles & Albums, consider Record Retailer the canonical source for the British singles chart in the 1960s; While NME had the biggest circulation of charts in the 1960s and was more widely followed, Melody Makers chart was considered more influential and equally highly cited. After 1969, the joint venture between Record Retailer and the BBC is widely considered as the beginning of the official UK Singles Chart. Melody Maker, like NME, continued compiling its own chart until 14 May 1988.

Notable differences in the Melody Maker charts in this decade when compared to the official chart run by BMRB and even NME are additional number-one singles for Gary Glitter, Queen, Showaddywaddy, Wings, The Real Thing, David Soul, John Travolta and The Jam. Such songs as "Boogie Nights" by Heatwave and "Ain't Gonna Bump No More (With No Big Fat Woman)" by Joe Tex reached the top of the Melody Maker chart although neither topped the BMRB or NME charts. Twenty-two acts achieved a number-one single on the Melody Maker chart but never had an official number-one single, although one of them was part of a singing duo whose other half had reached number one solo.

During the 1970s, Melody Maker charted 201 number-one singles, of which 49 did not make the top of the official UK Singles Chart.  Of that figure, 18 singles also did not reach number one on the NME charts. One of the standouts in Melody Makers unique number ones of the 1970s was "Rodrigo's Guitar Concerto de Aranjuez (Theme From 2nd Movement)" by Manuel and the Music of the Mountains (pseudonym of veteran arranger/conductor Geoff Love), which was number one for one week in February 1976. The BBC, which drew their charts from the BMRB, had announced this as the number one single in the United Kingdom, but the chart was withdrawn four hours later due to compilation errors, making it the shortest period that a song had been number one on the official charts. Melody Maker thus had this at number one for six days and twenty hours longer than the BBC.

Number-one singles

Notes

References
Footnotes

Lists of number-one songs in the United Kingdom
1970s in British music
1970s record charts